Peace Point Entertainment Group was a Canadian Toronto-based independent television production company,

with a long list of popular television series seen in Canada, United States and with extensive worldwide distribution. It acquired DIDtv, relaunching it as Peace Point Entertainment USA as part of the deal. In December 2012, Shavick Entertainment purchased Pink Triangle Press's 24.94% interest and Peace Point Entertainment Group's 15% interest in OUTtv. Peace Point Entertainment was founded in 2002 by Les Tomlin (CEO) and business partner Vallery Hyduk (Vice President).. After over 15 years as a leading Canadian media company, Peace Point is no longer operating and its vast catelogue of show were sold to Boatrocker Entertainment and their television series continue to air globally.   CEO Les Tomlin is pursuing other business interests and Vallery Hyduk relocated to Detroit, Michigan to pursue real estate opportunities.

Past productions
 Best Sellers
 Barn stormers
 Bulloch Family Ranch
 Bump!
 Camp N Out
 Chimp Mommy
 Colin & Justin's Cabin Pressure
 Colin & Justin's Street Swap
 DecAIDS
 Devil's Perch
 Ed's Up!
 Escape or Die
 FANatical
 Food Jammers
 Food Truck Face Off
 Fresh with Anna Olson
 Hammer & Chew
 Invention Nation
 Keasha's Perfect Dress
 The Outhouse
 Real Fight Club
 Reality Obsessed
 Shack Attack
 Harry Hill’s TV Burp
 Hilda
 Tanlines
 Urban Nites
When English Football Ruled Europe 2008
Trial and Retribution X
Bake with Anna Olson
The Bill
Not Going Out
You’ve Been Framed
Hollyoaks
The X Factor
Sell Me Your Style
Crossroads
Goodbye Mr.Chips
Bad Girls
Taggart
Spitting Image
 The Durrells
 Inspired with The Durrell Family

References

External links
 

Television production companies of Canada
Companies based in Toronto